Flindersia ifflana, commonly known as hickory ash or Cairns hickory, is a species of tree in the family Rutaceae and is native to Papua New Guinea and Queensland. It has pinnate leaves with between four and twelve egg-shaped to elliptical leaflets, panicles of white or cream-coloured flowers and woody fruit studded with rough points.

Description

Taxonomy
Flindersia ifflana was first formally described in 1877 by Ferdinand von Mueller in Fragmenta phytographiae Australiae from specimens collected by Walter Hill near Trinity Bay.

Distribution and habitat

References

ifflana
Sapindales of Australia
Flora of Papua New Guinea
Flora of Queensland
Plants described in 1877
Taxa named by Ferdinand von Mueller